The Stock Car Corrida do Milhão (Stock Car Million Race) (formally the Corrida do Milhão Goodyear) was a Stock Car Brasil auto race held annually in Brazil. It was organized by Vicar Promoções Desportivas and the winner earned R$1 million (US$ 303'476), the largest prize given in a South American motorsports championship. The race is not held since 2021.

History

The first race was held in 2008 at Autódromo Internacional Nelson Piquet, Rio de Janeiro, however the event was not held in 2009. The event returned in 2010 having moved to the Autódromo José Carlos Pace in São Paulo. The event was held at the Goiânia in 2014 and 2015. Interlagos hosted the 2016 edition. The 2017 edition moved to Curitiba.

Thiago Camilo and the Ipiranga-RCM team are the most successful team-driver combination, winning 3 of the 7 events. The first seven events were won by Chevrolet drivers, with Felipe Fraga breaking the drought in 2016, winning for Peugeot on the races' return to Interlagos.

The race was sponsored by SKY Brasil in 2008, Goodyear at 2010, Brasil Máquinas at 2011 and Goodyear returns in 2012.

Guest drivers
  Jacques Villeneuve (2011)
  Rubens Barrichello (2012)
  Hélio Castroneves (2012)
  Tony Kanaan (2012)
  Raphael Matos (2012)
  Bruno Senna (2013)
  Lucas di Grassi (2019)

Results

References

Stock Car Brasil